This is a list of ski areas and resorts in Alberta. The list is organized in order of the size of skiable area.

Large mountain/foothills resorts

 Lake Louise Ski Resort ( of skiable area)
 Sunshine Village ( of skiable area)
 Marmot Basin ( of skiable area)
 Nakiska ( of skiable area)
 Mt Norquay ( of skiable area)

Other mountain/foothills Resorts
 Fortress Mountain Resort ( of skiable area) - Closed, only open for cat skiing
 Silver Summit ( of skiable area)

Prairie resorts
 Canyon Ski Area ( of skiable area) 
 Hidden Valley Ski Resort

References

Alberta